Trebušovce is a village and municipality in the Veľký Krtíš District of the Banská Bystrica Region of southern Slovakia.

Geography

Demographics
According to the 2011 census, it had a population of 201 inhabitants, out of which 144 were Hungarians and 48 were Slovaks.

History

After the Treaty of Trianon it became part of Czechoslovakia. As a result of the First Vienna Award, it returned to the Kingdom of Hungary until the end of WW II. Afterwards it again became part of Czechoslovakia until the Velvet Divorce. Since then it has been part of Slovakia.

Notable people
Ernő Gerő (1898–1980), Hungarian communist leader

External links
http://www.statistics.sk/mosmis/eng/run.html

Villages and municipalities in Veľký Krtíš District